The House of Bobali or Babalio (in Italian; known as Bobaljević or Bobalić in Croatian) was a noble family of the Republic of Ragusa.

History 
The family is considered to be one of those which founded the ancient community of Dubrovnik. The surname is attested in various forms in different places: Baebiblius nearby Salona, Babuleius, Babullia, Bobuli or Boboli in Italy. One of the etymologies proposed considers that all these surnames are derived from the early-medieval name Babilius or Babilonius. According to another ancient tradition the Bobali originated in Bosnia in the 10th century.

The Bobali gave the Republic a large number of politicians, scholars and writers. In the 14th century they had 124 senior civil servants in senate (representing 3.32%). Similarly, between 1440 and 1640 there were 64 Bobali in the Grand Council (2.91% of total). In two hundred years, they had 59 senatorial positions (1.81%), 66 members of the Minor Council (3.05%), 23 Guardians of Justice (2.80%) and for 59 times a member of Bobali that became Rettore of the Republic (2.48%).

The Bobali family became extinct in 1771 with the death of Frano Damjanov Bobali.

Notable people 
 Domanja Bobaljević (14th century) – priest and politician, served Bosnian Ban Stephen II. He fought the Bosnian Church and defended Bosnia from aspirations of Serbian Emperor Stefan Dušan.
 Francesco Cuco de Bobali (16th century) – poet and writer, left many songs, collected by abbot Giorgi in a volume entitled Poesie de Cuco il seniore.
 Savino Bobali (1530–1585) – poet and writer among the most important of his time (Rime amorose, pastorali e satiriche del magnifico Savino de Bobali Sordo).
 Marino de Bobali (17th century) – was a writer and philosopher. His work was printed in 1654 in Aquileia (Friuli). The best-known work was titled Del senso predominato dalla ragione ("About senses ruled by reason").

References

Sources 
 Francesco Maria Appendini, Notizie istorico-critiche sulle antichità storia e letteratura de' Ragusei, Dalle stampe di Antonio Martecchini, Ragusa 1803
 Renzo de' Vidovich, Albo d'Oro delle famiglie nobili patrizie e illustri nel Regno di Dalmazia, Cultural Scientific Foundation Rustia Traine, Trieste 2004
 Simeon Gliubich, Biographical dictionary of illustrious Dalmatian men, wien-Zadar 1836
 Giorgio Gozzi, The free and sovereign Republic of Ragusa 634–1814, Volpe Editore, Rome 1981
 Robin Harris, Storia e vita di Ragusa – Dubrovnik, la piccola Repubblica adriatica, Santi Quaranta, Treviso 2008
 Konstantin Jireček, The Legacy of Rome in the cities of Dalmatia in the Middle Ages, 3 vols., AMSD, Rome 1984–1986
Dubrovacka vlastela izmedu roda i drzave, Stjepan Cosic, Nenad Vekaric, HAZU 2003

Ragusan noble families